The 2011 IFSC Climbing World Cup was held in 20 locations. Bouldering competitions were held in 9 locations, lead in 10 locations, and speed in 5 locations. The season began on 14 April in Milano, Italy and concluded on 27 November in Barcelona, Spain.

The top 3 in each competition received medals, and the overall winners were awarded trophies. At the end of the season an overall ranking was determined based upon points, which athletes were awarded for finishing in the top 30 of each individual event.

The winners for bouldering were Kilian Fischhuber and Anna Stöhr, for lead Jakob Schubert and Mina Markovič, for speed Lukasz Swirk and Edyta Ropek, and for combined Jakob Schubert and Mina Markovič, men and women respectively.
The National Team for bouldering was France, for lead Austria, and for speed Russian Federation.

Highlights of the season 
In bouldering, at the World Cup in Vail, Kilian Fischhuber of Austria flashed all boulders in the final round to take the win. Then at the World Cup in Munich, Dmitrii Sharafutdinov of Russia also flashed all boulders in the final round to take the win.
At the end of the season, Austrian athletes, Kilian Fischhuber and Anna Stöhr clinched the overall titles of the season for men and women respectively, making it double bouldering titles for Austria.

In speed climbing, at the end of the season, Polish athletes, Lukasz Swirk and Edyta Ropek clinched the overall titles of the season for men and women respectively, making it double speed titles for Poland.

Overview

References 

IFSC Climbing World Cup
2011 in sport climbing